Maravar (also known as Maravan and Marava) are a Tamil community in the state of Tamil Nadu. These people are one of the three branches of the Mukkulathor confederacy. Members of the Maravar community often use the honorific title Thevar. They are classified as an Other Backward Class or a Denotified Tribe in Tamil Nadu, depending on the district.

The Sethupathi rulers of the erstwhile Ramnad kingdom were from this community. The Maravar community, along with the Kallars, had a reputation for thieving and robbery from as early as the medieval period.

Etymology
The term Maravar has diverse proposed etymologies; it may come simply from a Tamil word maram, meaning such things as vice and ''murder. or a term meaning "bravery".

Social status

The Maravars were considered as Shudras and were free to worship in Hindu temples. According to Pamela G, Price, the Maravar were warriors who were in some cases zamindars. During the British colonial era, the Maravars were sometimes recorded as Kshatriyas by the legal officers involved in Zamindari litigation proceedings but more often they classified as Shudras. Maravars were the only ruling castes of Tamil origin in Tamil Nadu. The zamins of Singampatti, Urkadu, Nerkattanseval, Thalavankottai, all ruled by members of Maravar caste. Occasionally the Setupathis had to respond to the charge they were not ritually pure.

During the formation of Tamilaham, the Maravars were brought in as socially outcast tribes or traditionally as lowest entrants into the shudra category. The Maravas to this day are feared as a thieving tribe and are an ostracised group in Tirunelveli region.

See also
Uthumalai
Kallar
Agamudayar

References

Mukkulathor
Social groups of Tamil Nadu
Other Backward Classes
Denotified tribes of India